Sourdough Glacier is in the Wind River Range, Bridger-Teton National Forest in the U.S. state of Wyoming. Sourdough Glacier is in the Bridger Wilderness, and is part of the largest grouping of glaciers in the American Rocky Mountains.

References

See also
 List of glaciers in the United States

Glaciers of Sublette County, Wyoming
Glaciers of Wyoming